Sugiuchi is a Japanese surname. Notable people with the surname include:

, Japanese Go player
, Japanese Paralympic swimmer
, Japanese baseball player

Japanese-language surnames